"Judy Teen" is a song by the British rock band Cockney Rebel, fronted by Steve Harley. It was released as a non-album single in 1974, and became the band's first UK hit, after their debut single, "Sebastian", was only a hit in continental Europe. "Judy Teen" was written by Harley, and produced by Harley and Alan Parsons.

Writing
While Cockney Rebel's debut single "Sebastian" became a big hit across continental Europe in 1973–74, it failed to enter the UK charts, as did the band's debut album, The Human Menagerie, when it was released in November 1973. The lack of UK success for "Sebastian" and the album left Cockney Rebel's label, EMI Records, feeling the band had yet to record a potential hit single. In response, Harley went away to re-work an unfinished song titled "Judy Teen", with the objective of making a single with commercial potential. Harley later recalled, 

Cockney Rebel had originally recorded "Judy Teen" as a demo in 1972, but it was not recorded for The Human Menagerie. The band's earliest incarnation, featuring Pete Newnham on guitar, recorded three demos at Riverside Recordings: "Judy Teen", "Ritz" and "That's Alright That's Me". Speaking to the fan site Harley Fanzone, Newnham recalled, 

A previously unreleased early version of "Judy Teen" appeared on Cavaliers: An Anthology 1973-1974 in 2012. It was recorded at Audio International Studios on 1 March 1973.

Release
Once Harley finished developing "Judy Teen", the band recorded it as their next single with Harley and Alan Parsons as the producers. It was delivered to EMI with an expected release in early 1974, but the label soon decided to delay the release in favour of  giving "Sebastian" its third UK re-issue on 25 January 1974. "Sebastian" failed again to become a UK hit and EMI then released "Judy Teen" as a single in March. It successfully broke the band commercially in the UK, reaching number 5 in the UK Singles Chart, and it remained in the top 50 for eleven weeks. It reached number one on Capital Radio's 'Capital Countdown' Top 40, and was chosen as Johnnie Walker's 'Record of the Week' on BBC Radio 1. The song also found chart success in Europe too.

The UK success of "Judy Teen" gave the band instant popularity, which the band discovered during the 42–date UK tour for their second album The Psychomodo. Speaking to New Musical Express in June 1974, drummer Stuart Elliott spoke of the change in audience since "Judy Teen" became a hit, "The only trouble with the hit single is that they only come for that. We'll play a whole set from The Psychomodo and The Human Menagerie, and they don't really appreciate it. As soon as you play 'Judy Teen' they go bloody mad." Violinist Jean-Paul Crocker added, 

"Judy Teen" was released by EMI Records on 7-inch vinyl in the UK, Ireland, Belgium, Germany, Holland, Spain, Portugal, Italy, Japan and Australia. The B-side, "Spaced Out", was written by Harley, and produced by Harley and Parsons. It was exclusive to the single, but would later be included on a number of releases, the first being the 1992 CD single re-issue of the band's 1975 hit "Make Me Smile (Come Up and See Me)". It has also appeared as a bonus track on the 2000 CD re-issue of Harley's 1978 album Hobo with a Grin and on Cavaliers: An Anthology 1973-1974.

Promotion
A music video was filmed in April 1974, which featured the band performing the song, with some shots using kaleidoscope effects. On 23 May 1974, the band performed the song on the UK music show Top of the Pops. Although small segments of the performance survive, the original, full video has been presumed lost.

Since its release, "Judy Teen" has been a consistent inclusion in Harley and the band's concerts, and various live versions have been recorded for official releases. On 14 April 1975, Steve Harley & Cockney Rebel performed the song as part of their set at the Hammersmith Odeon, London, which was filmed and released as the film Between the Lines. Further live versions have been included on Live from London (1985), Stripped to the Bare Bones (1999), Anytime! (A Live Set) (2004), Live at the Isle of Wight Festival (2005) and Birmingham (Live with Orchestra & Choir) (2013).

Critical reception
On its release, Charles Shaar Murray of New Musical Express described the song as "another mincingly affected Roxy Music copy, but it could conceivably affect others differently". He added that the song's introduction was "exactly the same" as the DeFranco Family's "Abra-Ca-Dabra". Peter Jones of Record & Radio Mirror noted the song's "delicate, tinkling opening" and "very together sound as it builds along". He concluded, "If this one does make it, it will do it against the normal odds, because it isn't a straight, blatant commercial effort. I like it." Deborah Thomas of the Daily Mirror wrote, "A hanky panky hit for madcap popsters Cockney Rebel. Clever words, a commercial tune and screwball sound effects make for a sure-fire success." Dave Lewis of the Acton Gazette and West London Post considered the song to be "a sort of Mexican two-step picked out on an electric mandolin with a beefy backing". He did not believe the song would be the one to provide Cockney Rebel with a commercial breakthrough. The Belgian magazine Juke Box described the song as mixing the rhythm of "Sweet Pea" (the Manfred Mann version) with a little bit of "Catch a Falling Star".

Donald A. Guarisco retrospectively reviewed the song for AllMusic, stating, "Most glam acts were either arty or purely commercial, but other groups were able to blend both styles to create singles that were as challenging as they were catchy. Harley was able to straddle this balance and 'Judy Teen' is a good example of this skill". He noted the "light-hearted lyrics", the "swinging mid-tempo verses" with a "waltz-like beat" and the "more up-tempo chorus that builds to an effervescent peak". He concluded, "The song's plentiful hooks [are wrapped] in some unique ear candy, the result catchy enough for a wide audience but clever enough to snare in ambitious listeners with its wordplay." Carol Clerk of Classic Rock, in a 2006 review of The Cockney Rebel – A Steve Harley Anthology, commented on the song being "exquisitely crafted and arranged, and determinedly eccentric to boot". Chris Roberts of Uncut commented, "Harley's band slid perfectly into the post-Ziggy/Roxy slipstream, all mannered English vocals, florid lyrics and sexual-theatrical rock. Tricksy hits like 'Judy Teen' and 'Mr. Soft' displayed arch wit."

In a 1990 interview, English musician and singer David Gedge of The Wedding Present recalled "Judy Teen" as being an early musical influence, "The first single I heard was 'Judy Teen' on Top of the Pops and I thought it was brilliant. I've always liked things which are a bit extreme, and for someone to come into TOTP and look like that and make this record that was so strange, I was quite impressed by it really."

Track listing
7-inch single
"Judy Teen" – 3:45
"Spaced Out" – 3:04

Personnel 
Cockney Rebel
 Steve Harley – lead vocals, producer
 Jean-Paul Crocker – electric violin, guitar
 Paul Jeffreys – Fender bass
 Milton Reame-James – keyboards
 Stuart Elliott – drums, percussion

Production
 Alan Parsons – producer

Charts

References

1974 songs
1974 singles
EMI Records singles
Steve Harley songs
Songs written by Steve Harley
Song recordings produced by Alan Parsons